is a 1994 fighting video game developed by Sega. It is the sequel to 1993's Virtua Fighter and the second game in the Virtua Fighter series. It was created by Sega's Yu Suzuki-headed AM2 and was released for the arcades in 1994. Ports were released for the Sega Saturn in 1995 and Microsoft Windows in 1997.

Virtua Fighter 2 was critically acclaimed for its gameplay and breakthrough graphics; it introduced the use of texture-mapped 3D characters, and was one of the first video games to use motion capture animation technology. It became a major arcade hit, selling more than 40,000 arcade units worldwide and becoming one of Sega's best-selling arcade games of all time. The Sega Saturn version was also well-received for its graphics and gameplay. It became a blockbuster hit in Japan and sold relatively well in other markets, selling more than  units.

Gameplay
Virtua Fighter 2 is a 3D 1v1 fighting game, similar in concept to other games of the series. Players select a character, and attempt to use that character to overcome a series of opponents. This can be done by simply knocking the other character out (by dealing enough damage), or by knocking them out of the square "ring" in which the fights take place. Each fight takes place over a number of rounds; typically 3 rounds in a best-of-3 approach (though this can be varied). The game is played with an eight-way stick to control character movement, and three buttons (guard, punch and kick), which are used in various motions to pull off a character's signature attacks.

The arena size could be adjusted up to a very small platform or all the way to 82 meters (269 feet). This is the only game in the series—other than Virtua Fighter Remix—that could have such size adjustments. The physical energy meter could also be adjusted to infinity, giving the player the advantage when beating opponents or practicing moves against the computer player. Adjusting the arena to a smaller size and giving the characters infinite health could lead to mock sumo matches, wherein victory is achieved by knocking the other player's character out of the ring.

Each character has their own fighting style, loosely based on various real-world fighting methods, such as wrestling or eastern styles. Characters each have many unique moves; however, like in the original Virtua Fighter, many of the characters share a number of moves with another character (for instance, Lau Chan and Pai Chan each practice similar forms of Kung Fu). In addition, the entire roster of characters shares certain moves and functions; for instance, every character has a basic throw that can be executed by pressing the guard and punch buttons simultaneously. The number and variety of attacks possessed by each character has also been expanded, including the addition of counter-attacks and the ability to prevent throws (with very quick reactions required on part of the player).

All nine characters from the original Virtua Fighter are once again playable in Virtua Fighter 2. The sequel also adds two new characters: Shun Di, an old drunken fist master from China, and Lion Rafale, the French son of a rich businessman who uses praying mantis style kung fu. Additionally, Shun and Lion possess the unique ability to perform "axis strikes" in which they would move around the attacks of other characters, accentuating the game's 3D nature.

Plot
Virtua Fighter 2 presents no narrative in-game; there is no story-based intro sequence, no narrative character endings and very little text to supply much of a plot. However, the game was given a story in its supporting material, such as the manual for the Sega Saturn version.

Virtua Fighter 2 hinges around a fighting tournament, where the greatest fighters in the world seek to compete for fame and glory. However, the tournament is organised by the sinister "J6" syndicate, who intend to use the information gathered to perfect their fighting cyborg "Dural" (the game's boss, who uses a move-set made up of other character's moves).

Development

Arcade version
The game took Sega AM2 roughly 12 months to develop. The game's head developer was Yu Suzuki. For Virtua Fighter 2, he wanted to introduce texture mapping to the characters, who lacked textures in the original game. However, the Sega Model 1 arcade system lacked texture mapping hardware, so the Sega Model 2 system was developed for the game. To render the game's texture-mapped characters, it cost  ( adjusted for inflation) to purchase a texture-mapping graphics processor from the military flight simulation firm Lockheed Martin. Suzuki convinced Sega to purchase the chip, which his team then adapted into a much cheaper processor for video game use in the Model 2 hardware.

The game made use of advanced motion capture animation, with similar technology to what was used in the healthcare and military industries, capable of magnetic motion capture to track head movements. Other improvements over its predecessor include a framerate of 60 frames per second, new fighting arenas, two new characters, 500 new moves, and 1,200 motion patterns (compared to 700 patterns in the original).

In a 1995 interview, Suzuki said Virtua Fighter 2 was his favorite of all the games he had made, elaborating that he was particularly pleased with the way the polygonal graphics "added a sense of reality" to the characters' motions, and the addition of counterattacks. The developers designed four new characters, only two of which, Lion and Shun, made it into the final game.

Saturn version
At the beginning of 1995, Sega AM2's Sega Saturn division was split into three sub-departments, each one charged with porting a different arcade game to the Saturn: Virtua Fighter 2, Virtua Cop, and Daytona USA. Due to unexpectedly slow progress in the Daytona USA port, a number of members of the Virtua Fighter 2 team were reassigned to Daytona USA. In March, AM2 Research completed the Sega Graphics Library, a Saturn operating system which made it feasible to create a near-arcade perfect port of Virtua Fighter 2 for the Saturn.

After completing the Daytona USA port in April, the team took a short holiday before beginning work on the Virtua Fighter 2 conversion in earnest. In June, AM2 gave the first public demonstration of Saturn Virtua Fighter 2 at the Tokyo Toy Show. To increase confidence in the accuracy of the port, they displayed non-playable demos of the characters Lion, Shun, Pai, and Lau running on the Saturn hardware at 60 frames per second - the same speed as the arcade version.

However, AM2 continued to face problems in creating an accurate port for the Saturn. Due to the high number of moves in Virtua Fighter 2, months had to be spent on developing compression techniques in order to fit all of the game's moves onto a single CD. Also, in order to maintain the 60 frames per second, the Saturn version could not use nearly as many polygons as the arcade version. To make this difference less apparent, the programming team made use of texture mapping for the characters, taking advantage of the fact that the Saturn could map 16 different colors to each polygon, whereas the Model 2 arcade hardware could map only one color per polygon. In addition, the polygon background objects of the arcade version were replaced with parallax scrolling playfields with selective scaling. The AM2 team also used data from Virtua Fighter Remix as a reference for some elements. In an interview during development, Keiji Okayasu discussed the team's struggles with getting the Saturn version to run at 60 frames per second: 

By the end of September, hit detection had been enabled, and the now fully playable conversion was displayed at the JAMMA show. Taking into account audience reactions at the JAMMA show, the team spent the next two months on final adjustments, play-testing, and the addition of Saturn-specific options. Development on the port was completed in November 1995.

Release
The original arcade game released for the Japanese market in November 1994. It then released overseas for Europe in December 1994, and North America in January 1995.

Virtua Fighter 2.1 is a revised version featuring re-tweaked gameplay, slightly enhanced graphics and the ability to play as Dural. Though it was never released outside Japan, it is possible to switch to the 2.1 game mechanics in the Saturn and PC ports; however, none of the other features are updated. This version was also released in the Sega Ages 2500 series.

The Saturn port was scheduled for a December 1995 release in Europe, in time for the crucial Christmas shopping season, but it did not appear until the end of the following January. A 2D remake was released for the Mega Drive/Genesis in 1996. In addition, Virtua Fighter 2 was converted for the PlayStation 2 in 2004 as part of Sega's Ages 2500 series in Japan. The Mega Drive/Genesis port was re-released on the PS2 and PSP in 2006 as part of Sega Genesis Collection, on the Virtual Console for the Wii on March 20, 2007 (Japan) and April 16, 2007 (North America), on December 15, 2022 on the Nintendo Switch Online + Expansion Pack, and for iOS on January 20, 2011. A port of the arcade version was released digitally for Xbox 360 and PlayStation 3 in November 2012.

In Japan, a Virtua Fighter 2 "CG Portrait Series" of discs were released for the Saturn. Each of the 11 discs (one for each playable character) contains a slideshow of high-resolution CG stills of the character engaged in non-fighting activities such as playing pool or eating ice cream, backed by a Japanese pop song, as well as a karaoke mode.

Reception

Arcade version
In Japan, Game Machine listed Virtua Fighter 2 on their January 1, 1995 issue as being the most-successful arcade game of the month. It went on to become Japan's highest-grossing arcade game for two years in a row, in 1995 and 1996. In the United States, the game also generated high earnings upon release, and went on to become one of America's top ten best-selling arcade video games of 1995. , over 40,000 arcade units were sold worldwide. Virtua Fighter and Virtua Fighter 2 became Sega's best-selling arcade games of all time, surpassing Out Run (1986).

Virtua Fighter 2 was critically acclaimed upon release. It used the Sega Model 2 arcade hardware to run the game at 60 frames per second at a high resolution with no slowdown (by comparison, the original Virtua Fighter ran at 30 frames per second). Computer and Video Games gave the arcade game a positive review, praising the "stunning visuals" as "quite possibly the best graphics ever seen in a fully-playable arcade title," the "quality of the animation" where "you can certainly feel each blow when they connect and the character reels back" and the "more accessible" combos which "opens up the opportunity for a number of new sequences." The magazine later called it "the greatest arcade game ever made" in December 1995.

Saturn version
Sega reported pre-orders of 1.5 million units for the Saturn version of Virtua Fighter 2 in Japan, which is nearly as many of the number of Saturns that had been sold in Japan at that point. Upon its Japanese release, 700,000 copies were sold within two days. It was the third best-selling home video game of 1995 in Japan, below Dragon Quest VI and Chrono Trigger. Virtua Fighter 2 also became the top-selling game worldwide for the Saturn, and remains the highest-selling Saturn game in Japan with 1.7 million copies sold. In the United States, the game was bundled with various Saturn consoles for a while alongside Daytona USA and Virtua Cop, which helped boost the Saturn's sales. Virtua Fighter 2 sold more than 500,000 bundled copies in the United States by December 1996, bringing total sales to more than  units sold in Japan and the United States.

The Saturn port was critically acclaimed upon release. Next Generation gave the game a perfect 5/5 stars, calling it "the ultimate arcade translation" and "the best fighting game ever." The magazine cited its "accurate representation of 10 very distinct and realistic fighting styles", "remarkable AI", and "a general attention to detail that sets a new mark for quality game design." Sega Saturn Magazine gave the Saturn version a 98%, citing the smooth frame rate, the realistically varied reactions to blows, the huge variety of moves, and the addition of features such as Team Battle Mode. Similarly praising the variety of moves and the accuracy of the port, Game Revolution gave the Saturn version an A and concluded that "Virtua Fighter 2 for the Saturn looks better and smoother than any other polygonal fighting game for the next generation systems. This just might be the best home console fighting game ever." GamePro called it "the game to own if you have a Saturn", citing the authentic fighting styles and moves, the new modes, the realistic animations with strong attention to detail, and the easy to master controls. They gave it a perfect score in all four categories (graphics, sound, control, and FunFactor).

The four reviewers of Electronic Gaming Monthly felt the port was not as arcade perfect as it could have been, but highly praised the wealth of options and modes, with two of their reviewers declaring it by far the best fighting game on the Saturn thus far. Game Informer's Andy, Reiner and Paul praised Virtua Fighter 2 for its depth and variety, but criticized inferior background details in the Saturn port, while Paul also felt that the original Virtua Fighter required more strategy. Maximum described the port as "remarkably similar to its coin-op parent - a game that's running on hardware that's 20 times more expensive than the Sega Saturn." They particularly praised the high-resolution graphics, smooth frame rate, "breathtaking" variety of moves, and the numerous Saturn-exclusive modes and options. With their one criticism being the very vulnerable opponent AI, they gave it their "Maximum Game of the Month" award.

Retrospective feedback on the Saturn version has continued to gather praise. GamesRadar ranked it the third-best Sega Saturn game, stating that "with Sonic sitting much of this generation out, is there a franchise more synonymous with the Saturn than Virtua Fighter?"  1UP described the Saturn port as featuring "crisp, fast visuals and deeply nuanced game mechanics." They also claimed the game had aged well, unlike other fighters released around the time, such as the original Tekken. IGN also ranked it as the second-best Sega Saturn game, saying that the game "stands head and shoulders above all 32-bit fighters. All of them."

Accolades
Gamest Awards gave Virtua Fighter 2 the top awards for Game of the Year, Best Fighting Game, Best Graphics, and Most Popular Game. Game Players magazine also awarded it Game of the Year. GamePro awarded it Best Saturn Game of 1995. The AMOA Awards nominated it for Most Innovative New Technology.

Virtua Fighter 2 was ranked as the 19th-best arcade game of the 1990s by Complex. In 1996, GamesMaster rated the Saturn version 2nd on their "The GamesMaster Saturn Top 10."  In the same issue, they also listed the game 13th in its "Top 100 Games of All Time." It has also been listed as one of the best games of all time by Next Generation in 1996 and 1999, IGN in 2003, Famitsu in 2006, 
Stuff in 2008, and Electronic Gaming Monthly in 1997, 2001, and 2006.

Other versions

GameSpot praised the game's realism, depth, and opponent AI, and the PC version's inclusion of online multiplayer. They deemed it "unquestionably the best fighting game on the PC, and certainly one of the finest fighting games of all time", adding that the PC version "rivals even the excellent Sega Saturn console port." The PlayStation 2 port of the game was criticized for failing to be faithful to the original arcade version.

References

External links
 
 
 

1994 video games
Arcade video games
IOS games
Nintendo Switch Online games
PlayStation Network games
Sega-AM2 games
Sega arcade games
Sega Genesis games
Sega Saturn games
Fighting games
Video game sequels
Virtua Fighter
Virtual Console games
Windows games
Xbox 360 Live Arcade games
PlayStation 2 games
Video games with AI-versus-AI modes
Video games developed in Japan
Video games designed by Yu Suzuki
Video games scored by Takayuki Nakamura
Video games scored by Takenobu Mitsuyoshi